Tell Ghoraifé is a prehistoric, Neolithic tell, about  east of Damascus, Syria.

A small,  excavation was made on the tell by Henri de Contenson in 1974.

Materials discovered, particularly the stylistic traits of the lithic tools, show similarities with Southern Levantine Pre-Pottery Neolithic A and Pre-Pottery Neolithic B sites. Tell Ghoraifé is closely related other Neolithic sites in the Damascus basin, like Tell Aswad and Tell Ramad. Despite the similarities these sites share with Euphrates valley sites such as building materials, pre-pottery White Ware and burial rites, they represent a separate, distinct group from the Euphrates valley.

Tell Ghoraifé is an important site to our understanding of the origin of agriculture. It is an example of a site with a long sequence over a millennium where the study of the evolution from wild to domesticated barley has taken place.  Finds also included early domesticated wheat.

Literature 

 de Contenson, H., Bibliothèque archéologique et historique 137  Aswad et Ghoraifé : sites néolithiques en Damascène (Syrie) aux IXème et VIIIème millénaires avant l'ère chrétienne, Bibliothèque Archéologique et Historique, 137, Beirut, 1995
 van Zeist, W. Bakker-Heeres, J.A.H., Archaeobotanical Studies in the Levant 1. Neolithic Sites in the Damascus Basin: Aswad, Ghoraifé, Ramad - Palaeohistoria, 24, 165-256, 1982.

Footnotes

1974 archaeological discoveries
Neolithic settlements
Neolithic sites in Syria
Archaeological sites in Rif Dimashq Governorate
Pre-Pottery Neolithic B